Gymnothorax hansi is an eel in the family Muraenidae (moray eels). It was described by Phillip C. Heemstra in 2004. It is a tropical, marine eel which is known from reefs around Grand Comoro Island, in the Indian Ocean.

References

hansi
Fish described in 2004